Cignani is a surname. Notable people with the surname include:

Carlo Cignani (1628–1719), Italian painter
Felice Cignani (1660–1724), Italian painter, son of Carlo

Italian-language surnames